{{Taxobox
| name = Mycobacterium avium complex
| domain = Bacteria
| phylum = Actinomycetota
| classis = Actinomycetia
| ordo = Mycobacteriales
| familia = Mycobacteriaceae
| genus = Mycobacterium
| species_complex = Mycobacterium avium complex| binomial = Mycobacterium intracellulare
| binomial_authority = Runyon 1965,  ATCC 13950
| binomial2 = Mycobacterium avium
| binomial2_authority = Chester 1901 emend. Thorel et al. 1990

}}Mycobacterium avium complex is a group of mycobacteria comprising Mycobacterium intracellulare and Mycobacterium avium that are commonly grouped because they infect humans together; this group, in turn, is part of the group of nontuberculous mycobacteria.  These bacteria cause Mycobacterium avium-intracellulare infections or Mycobacterium avium complex infections in humans. These bacteria are common and are found in fresh and salt water, in household dust and in soil. MAC bacteria usually cause infection in those who are immunocompromised or those with severe lung disease.

Description
In the Runyon classification, both bacteria are nonchromogens.  They can be differentiated from M. tuberculosis and each other by commercially available DNA probes.

They are characterized as Gram-positive, nonmotile, acid-fast, short to long rods.

Colony characteristics
 Usually, colonies are smooth, rarely rough, and not pigmented colonies. Older colonies may become yellow.

Physiology
 Growth on Löwenstein-Jensen medium and Middlebrook 7H10 agar occurs at 37°C after seven or more days.
 The complex can be (but is not often) resistant to isoniazid, ethambutol, rifampin, and streptomycin.

Differential characteristics
 M. intracellulare and M. avium form the M. avium complex (MAC).
 Remarkable ITS heterogeneity is seen within different M. intracellulare isolates.

Species 
 Mycobacterium avium
 Mycobacterium avium subsp. paratuberculosis

Type strains
 M. intracellulare type strains include ATCC 13950, CCUG 28005, CIP 104243, DSM 43223, JCM 6384, and NCTC 13025.
 M. avium type strains include ATCC 25291, DSM 44156, and TMC 724.

Human health
MAC bacteria enter most people's body when inhaled into the lungs or swallowed, but only cause infection in those who are immunocompromised or who have severe lung disease such as those with cystic fibrosis or chronic obstructive lung disease (COPD). MAC infection can cause COPD and lymphadenitis, and can cause disseminated disease, especially in people with immunodeficiency.

History
In 2004, Tortoli et al. proposed the name M. chimaera for strains that a reverse hybridization–based line probe assay suggested belonged to MAIS (M. avium–M. intracellulare–M. scrofulaceum group), but were different from M. avium, M. intracellulare, or M. scrofulaceum. The new species name comes from the Chimera, a mythological being made up of parts of three different animals.

References

External links
 

Acid-fast bacilli
avium complex
Bacteria described in 1965